Phaedropsis domingalis is a moth in the family Crambidae. It was described by William Schaus in 1920. It is found in the Dominican Republic.

The wingspan is about 24 mm. The wings are orange yellow, the forewings with a black line across the costa and the cell near the base, as well as a subbasal black point on the inner margin. There is an antemedial black line on the costa and a medial point below the cell, as well as a thick black line on the discocellular. There are also fine and faint postmedial streaks on the costa. There is a small fuscous spot medially below vein 2 on the hindwings.

References

Spilomelinae
Moths described in 1920